Randview is a suburb of Johannesburg, South Africa. It is located in Region 8.

References

Johannesburg Region F